WGTH is a Southern Gospel and Religious-formatted broadcast radio station licensed to Richlands, Virginia, serving Southwestern Virginia and Southeastern West Virginia.  WGTH is owned and operated by High Knob Broadcasters, Inc.

References

External links
 The Sheep Online

1951 establishments in Virginia
Southern Gospel radio stations in the United States
Radio stations established in 1951
GTH
Tazewell County, Virginia